Kaulaʻināiwi Island is an island in Hawaii County, Hawaii.

References

Islands of Hawaii
Geography of Hawaii County, Hawaii